Metronome Spartacus is a Swedish television production company.  It produced the Norwegian soap-opera Hotel Caesar for the Norwegian television corporation TV 2, until it was cancelled on 31 mar 2017.

References

Television production companies of Sweden
Banijay